Devan Shimoyama (born 1989 in Philadelphia) is a contemporary African-American visual artist best known as a painter that uses mixed mediums in their work. Shimoyama's work is inspired by Black, queer, and male bodies from a personal perspective. The exploration of mythology and folklore also plays a key role in Shimoyama's work. Shimoyama uses his work to examine the intersections of race, class, gender, and sexuality within everyday life.

Early life and education 
Devan Shimoyama was born in Philadelphia, Pennsylvania in 1989.

Shimoyama was exposed to creativity at an early age as his mother studied fashion design and grandfather worked a musician. Though starting off in music as a kid, Shimoyama would later begin to take art courses as his mother noticed his talent with drawing.

He attended Pennsylvania State University as a science major for his undergraduate degree but would later change his program of study to Drawing and Painting during his junior year. Shimoyama would later graduate with his BFA in 2011. Shimoyama was under the advisement of Brian Alfred during undergrad. He then went on to receive his MFA in Painting/Printmaking from Yale University School of Art in 2014.

Artwork, style, and influence 

Devan Shimoyama's work focuses on race and sexuality. He often incorporates glitter and rhinestones into his paintings, which consist of large-scale portraits of himself, friends and acquaintances, and figures from his imagination. These characters are drawn from a wide range of sources, from men at barbershops to drag queens. The materials point to drag culture and challenge traditional notions of masculinity and representations of wealth.

Through his work, Shimoyama analyzes the intersections of queer culture and ways it relates to Black American culture. These aspect can often be highlighted through the usage of fur, feathers, glitter and costume jewels including rhinestones and sequins.

Solo/two person exhibitions 

 2021 – Devan Shimoyama, upcoming exhibition, Kunstpalais Erlangen, Erlangen, Germany
 2018 – Cry, Baby: Devan Shimoyama curated by Jessica Beck, The Andy Warhol Museum, Pittsburgh, PA

Group exhibitions 

 2020 – Translating Valence: redefining black male identity, Urban Institute for Contemporary Arts, MI
 2020 – Tell Me Your Story, Kunsthal KAdE, Amersfoort, Netherlands
 2019 – Getting to Know You, Cleveland Institute of Art, Cleveland, OH
 2019 – Men of Change: Power. Triumph. Truth., National Underground Railroad Freedom Center, Cincinnati, OH
 2017 – Fictions, Studio Museum in Harlem, New York, NY
 2016 – Bedazzled, Lehman College Gallery, Bronx, NY
 2016 – Cultural Landscapes, The Fed Galleries at KCAD, Grand Rapids, MI
 2016 – Introspective, BravinLee Programs, New York, NY
 2015 – UNLOADED, Northern Illinois University Art Museum, Dekalb, IL
 2015 – Realities in Contemporary Video Art, Screening, Fondation des Etats Unis, Paris

References 

21st-century American painters
Carnegie Mellon University faculty
1989 births
Artists from Philadelphia
Living people